Rousseauxia is a genus of flowering plants belonging to the family Melastomataceae.

It is native to Madagascar.
 
The genus name of Rousseauxia is in honour of Louis Auguste Joseph Desrousseaux (1753–1838), a French botanist and pteridologist. 
It was first described and published in Prodr. Vol.3 on page 152 in 1828.

Known species
According to Kew:
Rousseauxia andringitrensis 
Rousseauxia aurata 
Rousseauxia chrysophylla 
Rousseauxia cistoides 
Rousseauxia dionychoides 
Rousseauxia glauca 
Rousseauxia gracilis 
Rousseauxia humbertii 
Rousseauxia madagascariensis 
Rousseauxia mandrarensis 
Rousseauxia marojejensis 
Rousseauxia minimifolia 
Rousseauxia tamatavensis

References

Melastomataceae
Melastomataceae genera
Plants described in 1828
Endemic flora of Madagascar